Fluvial processes have made streams, stream beds, and river valleys which have various classifications.

Classification
There are five generic classifications:

Consequent streams are streams whose course is a direct consequence of the original slope of the surface upon which it developed, i.e., streams that follow slope of the land over which they originally formed.

Subsequent streams are streams whose course has been determined by selective headward erosion along weak strata. These streams have generally developed after the original stream. Subsequent streams developed independently of the original relief of the land and generally follow paths determined by the weak rock belts.
Resequent streams are streams whose course follows the original relief, but at a lower level than the original slope (e.g., flows down a course determined by the underlying strata in the same direction). These streams develop later and are generally a tributary to a subsequent stream.
Obsequent streams are streams flowing in the opposite direction of the consequent drainage.
Insequent streams have an almost random drainage often forming dendritic patterns. These are typically tributaries and have developed by a headward erosion on a horizontally stratified belt or on homogeneous rocks. These streams follow courses that apparently were not controlled by the original slope of the surface, its structure or the type of rock.

See also
Geomorphology

References

Bibliography
 

Fluvial landforms
Geomorphology
Water streams
Rivers